Union chrétienne de Saint-Chaumond may refer to:
 Union chrétienne de Saint-Chaumond (Poitiers) in Poitiers, France
 Union chrétienne de Saint-Chaumond (Spain) in Madrid, Spain